Pristicerops is a genus of parasitoid wasps belonging to the family Ichneumonidae.

The species of this genus are found in Europe.

Species:
 Pristicerops albosignatus (Habermehl, 1920) 
 Pristicerops bakeri (Davis, 1898)

References

Ichneumonidae
Ichneumonidae genera